Alexander Kosenkow (born 14 March 1977) is a German sprinter who specialises in the 100 metres. He represents the sports club TV Wattenscheid.

Biography
Kosenkow was born in Tokmok, Kirghiz SSR, but represented Germany at the 2008 Summer Olympics in Beijing. He competed at the 4 × 100 metres relay together with Tobias Unger, Till Helmke and Martin Keller. In their qualification heat they placed third behind Jamaica and Canada, but in front of China. Their time of 38.93 was the sixth fastest out of sixteen participating nations in the first round and they qualified for the final. There they sprinted to a time of 38.58 seconds, which was the fifth time.

Achievements

Personal bests
 100 m: 10.14 s (2003) - seventh on the German all-time list, behind Frank Emmelmann, Thomas Schröder, Sven Matthes, Eugen Ray, Steffen Bringmann and Marc Blume.
 200 m: 20.55 s (2004)

See also
 German all-time top lists - 100 metres

References

External links
 
 
 
 

1977 births
Living people
People from Chüy Region
German male sprinters
German people of Kyrgyzstani descent
German national athletics champions
Olympic athletes of Germany
Athletes (track and field) at the 2004 Summer Olympics
Athletes (track and field) at the 2008 Summer Olympics
Athletes (track and field) at the 2012 Summer Olympics
European Athletics Championships medalists
World Athletics Championships athletes for Germany
Russian and Soviet-German people